The Turning is a 2013 Australian anthology drama film based on a 2005 collection of short stories by Tim Winton. It premiered at the Melbourne International Film Festival on 3 August 2013. It was nominated for the 2013 Asia Pacific Screen Award for Best Feature Film, and was screened in the Berlinale Special Galas section of the 64th Berlin International Film Festival.

Cast
 Cate Blanchett as Gail Lang
 Hugo Weaving as Bob Lang
 Miranda Otto as Sherry
 Richard Roxburgh as Vic Lang
 Rose Byrne as Rae
 Mirrah Foulkes as Fay Keenan
 Harrison Gilbertson as Victor
 Callan Mulvey as David Wilson
 Myles Pollard as Dan
 Susie Porter as Carol
 Matt Nable as Max
 Meyne Wyatt as Frank Leaper

Production
18 directors worked on the film, including Mia Wasikowska, David Wenham, and Stephen Page who made their directorial debuts. Initially, Cate Blanchett also intended to direct before switching to an acting role, with Simon Stone taking her place behind the camera.

The Turning Ensemble

FOG
Jonathan auf der Heide (writer / director)
Tenille Kennedy (producer)
Jethro Woodward (composer)
Ellery Ryan (cinematographer)
Billy Browne (editor)
FAMILY
Shaun Gladwell (director)
Katherine Slattery (producer)
Emily Ballou (writer)
Kazumichi Grime (composer)
Jeremy Rouse (cinematographer)
Jesse Watt (editor)
DAMAGED GOODS
Anthony Lucas (producer / director)
Kris Mrksa (writer)
Cameron Patrick (composer)
Jody Muston (cinematographer)
Annabelle Johnson (editor)
SAND
Stephen Page (director)
John Harvey (producer)
Justin Monjo (writer)
Guy Gross (composer)
Bonnie Elliott (cinematographer)
LONG, CLEAR VIEW
Mia Wasikowska (writer / director)
Stefan Duscio (cinematographer)
Mat Evans (editor)

COCKLESHELL
Tony Ayres (director)
Julie Eckersley (producer)
Marcel Dorney (writer)
Iain Grandage (composer)
Germain McMicking (cinematographer)
SMALL MERCIES
Rhys Graham (writer / director)
Katherine Slattery (producer)
Flynn Wheeler (composer)
Stefan Duscio (cinematographer)
THE TURNING
Claire McCarthy (writer / director)
Sue Italiano (producer)
Denson Baker (cinematographer)
Beckett Broda (editor)
REUNION
Simon Stone (director)
Jo Dyer (producer)
Andrew Upton (writer)
Andrew Lesnie (cinematographer)
Dany Cooper (editor)
COMMISSION
David Wenham (writer / director)
Tenille Kennedy (producer)
Steve Nieve (composer)
Andrew Commis (cinematographer)

ABBREVIATION
Jub Clerc (writer / director)
Liz Kearney (producer)
Robert Woods (composer)
Geoffrey Simpson (cinematographer)
BONER McPHARLIN'S MOLL
Justin Kurzel (writer / director)
Sarah Shaw (producer)
Hat Fitz (composer)
Andrew Commis (cinematographer)
Michael J. Lutman (editor)
DEFENDER
Ian Meadows (writer / director)
Rita Walsh (producer)
Steve Francis (composer)
John Brawley (cinematographer)
Gabriel Dowrick (editor)
BIG WORLD
Warwick Thornton (writer / director / cinematographer)
Andrew Lancaster (composer)
Roland Gallois (editor)

AQUIFER
Robert Connolly (director)
Tenille Kennedy (producer)
Justin Monjo (writer)
Stephen Rae (composer)
Denson Baker (cinematographer)
Andy Canny (editor)
IMMUNITY
Yaron Lifschitz (director)
Alex Barnes & Ben Knapton (producers)
Circa Contemporary Circus (writer)
Ryan Walsh (composer)
Robert Humphreys (cinematographer)
ON HER KNEES
Ashlee Page (writer / director)
Sonya Humphrey (producer)
Michael Darren (composer)
Miles Rowland (cinematographer)
ASH WEDNESDAY
Marieka Walsh (writer / director)
Donna Chang (producer)
David Whittaker (editor)

90-minute broadcast version

The Turning was heavily cut down and rearranged for broadcast on ABC1, debuting on 23 February 2014. Running for approximately 90 minutes (as opposed to the 180-minute theatrical cut), only eight of the original 17 stories were included: "Reunion", "Aquifer", "On Her Knees", "The Turning", "Long, Clear View", "Commission", "Cockleshell", and "Sand". The remaining nine stories were made available online as multi-platform ABC iView content.

Reception
The Turning received positive reviews from critics and audiences, earning an approval rating of 85% on Rotten Tomatoes, based on 27 reviews.

Awards and nominations

References

External links

 
 
 

2013 films
Films set in Australia
Films shot in Australia
2013 drama films
Australian drama films
Australian anthology films
Films based on short fiction
2010s English-language films
Screen Australia films